The suffix -ey can appear in the English language:
 from Dutch/Scottish origin, as a diminutive like -ie or simply -y, with several other values
 from Old Norse, in placenames with the meaning of "island", as in Jersey, Guernsey, Alderney, or Caldey.

See also 
 EY (disambiguation)